H. C. Matthew Sim, a resident of Singapore, is the author of two business books and the coauthor of another.

He received his PhD from the University of South Australia, his B.E. (First Class Honours) from the University of Queensland, and his MBA from the National University of Singapore. Sim has a CDAF from Chartered Association of Certified Accountants, United Kingdom. he is a full member of Singapore Institute of Directors.

Sim was a diplomat in the Singapore Embassy in Yangon, Myanmar (formerly named Burma), and Centre Director of Singapore Trade Development Board Office in Yangon. He worked for Singapore Trade Development Board (TDB), TDB Holdings Ltd (an investment holding GLC), and Singapore TDB Consulting. He is now a lecturer in a leading education institution, Temasek Polytechnic.

Books
His books include:
Myanmar on My Mind, Times Books International (2001) 
Myanmar On My Mind was reviewed by Far Eastern Economic Review (28 June 2001), which called it the "politically most incorrect book of the year"; The Australian newspaper (23 July 2001); The Sunday Mail in Malaysia (24 June 2001), which said the book "is worth every sen [cent]"; Voice of America (9 and 16 July 2001); The New Paper (Sunday edition, 16 September 2001).
Budding Ideas At Work: A Practical Handbook to Get Entrepreneurs Started, co-written with Dr. Wee, Prentice Hall (2002) 
Entrepreneurship in Practice: A Practical Guide, Prentice Hall (2006) 
Entrepreneurship Success & Strategy, Prentice Hall (2009)

Notes

Singaporean writers
Singaporean non-fiction writers
Living people
National University of Singapore alumni
Year of birth missing (living people)